The 1990–91 Coppa Italia, the 44th Coppa Italia was an Italian Football Federation domestic cup competition won by Roma.

First round

|}

Second round

|}

Knockout stage

Final

First leg

Second leg

Roma won 4–2 on aggregate.

Top goalscorers

References

rsssf.com

Coppa Italia seasons
Coppa Italia
Coppa Italia